Ancient Maya: The Rise and Fall of a Rainforest Civilization (2004), an archaeological book written about the ancient Maya civilization. It was written  by Arthur Demarest, Ingram Professor of Anthropology at Vanderbilt University, Tennessee.

The book discusses the complex lifestyle and amazing political history of the Maya states, from the first to eighth centuries. It also gives an explanation of the mystery of the  ninth-century abandonment of most of the great rainforest cities. It goes on to conclude that the Maya civilization   has lessons for civilization today.

References

External links 
 Book at Cambridge Library catalogue

2004 non-fiction books
Maya civilization
American history books
Mesoamerican studies books